Aliabad (also Romanized as ‘Alīābād) is a village in Dehsard Rural District, in the Central District of Arzuiyeh County, Kerman Province, Iran. At the 2006 census, its population was 26, in 6 families.

References 

Populated places in Arzuiyeh County